Boris Isaakovich Berman (born August 15, 1948, Moscow) is a Soviet and Russian journalist and broadcaster.

Biography 

In 1971 he graduated with honors from the television department of the MSU Faculty of Journalism.

Since 1986 through 1989   commentator on cinema issues consultant movie APN.

Since 2003 to the present he has been working on the Channel One Russia.

In 2004–2014 years once a year (in the 20 days of February) conducted the program Interesting cinema in Berlin. In 2004-2013 he was the master of ceremonies of opening and closing of the Moscow International Film Festival, interviewed actors and directors on the red carpet.

Since June 2006,   the present time  the author and presenter of the program On the Night Watching (with Ildar Zhandarev).

Winner of the TEFI in the nomination The Best Program About Art (1995).

In 2009, Boris Berman was awarded TEFI paired with premium Ildar Zhandarev in the  interviewer.

References

External links
 Борис Берман и Ильдар Жандарёв: «Мы не страдаем болезнью, которой страдают многие из наших коллег, работающих в аналогичном жанре!»
 Boris Berman at the KinoPoisk

1948 births
Living people
Soviet television presenters
Russian television presenters
Russian television journalists
Moscow State University alumni
Mass media people from Moscow
Academicians of the Russian Academy of Cinema Arts and Sciences "Nika"
Soviet film critics
Russian film critics